KHLC may refer to:

 the ICAO code for Hill City Municipal Airport, in Graham County, Kansas, United States
 KHLC-LP, a defunct low-power television station (channel 52) formerly licensed to Hobbs, New Mexico, United States